Allen County is the name of several counties in the United States:

Allen County, Indiana 
Allen County, Kansas 
Allen County, Kentucky 
Allen County, Ohio 
Allen Parish, Louisiana